The following lists events that happened in 1925 in El Salvador.

Incumbents
President: Alfonso Quiñónez Molina
Vice President: Pío Romero Bosque

Events

Undated
 The El Salvador Olympic Committee was established.

Births
 8 October – Álvaro Magaña (d. 2001)
 23 November – José Napoleón Duarte (d. 1990)

References

Gould, Jeffrey L., Lauria-Santiago, Aldo A. (2008). To Rise in Darkness: Revolution, Repression, and Memory in El Salvador, 1920–1932. Duke University Press. 
Montgomery, Tommie Sue. (1995). Revolution In El Salvador: From Civil Strife To Civil Peace, Second Edition. Avalon Publishing. 

 
El Salvador
1920s in El Salvador
Years of the 20th century in El Salvador
El Salvador